Gelernter is a surname. Notable people with the surname include:

 David Gelernter (born 1955), American artist, writer and academic
 Herbert Gelernter (1929–2015), American computer scientist
 Joel Gelernter, American psychiatrist
 Mark Gelernter, American academic, historian, and writer